Jane Williams may refer to:

 Jane Williams (missionary) (1800–1896), Church Missionary Society missionary in New Zealand
 Jane Williams (silversmith), Irish silversmith
 Jane Williams (theologian), Christian theologian and writer
 Jane Williams (1798–1884), subject of poems by Percy Bysshe Shelley
 Jane Williams (Ysgafell) (1806–1885), Welsh writer
 Maria Jane Williams (1795–1873), Welsh musician
 Jane Williams (EastEnders), fictional character